Giuseppe Colucci may refer to:

Giuseppe Colucci (historian) (1752–1809), Italian historian
Giuseppe Colucci (footballer) (born 1980), Italian football midfielder